SS Thomas Todd was a Liberty ship built in the United States during World War II. She was named after Thomas Todd, an Associate Justice of the Supreme Court of the United States.

Construction
Thomas Todd was laid down on 14 August 1942, under a Maritime Commission (MARCOM) contract, MC hull 1492, by J.A. Jones Construction, Brunswick, Georgia; sponsored by Mrs. G.N. McIlhenny, and launched on 19 May 1943.

History
She was allocated to Standard Fruit & Steamship Company, on 30 June 1943. On 12 June 1946, she was laid up in the National Defense Reserve Fleet in the Hudson River Group. On 13 August 1956, she was withdrawn from the fleet to be loaded with grain under the "Grain Program 1955", she returned loaded with grain on 4 September 1956. She was again withdrawn from the fleet on 4 June 1963, to have the grain unloaded, she returned empty on 10 June 1963. On 26 October 1970, she was sold, along with three other Liberty ships, to Industrial y Comercial Levante, S.A. for $346,000, for scrapping, she was delivered to Spain on 1 January 1971.

References

Bibliography

 
 
 
 
 

 

Liberty ships
Ships built in Brunswick, Georgia
1943 ships
Hudson River Reserve Fleet
Hudson River Reserve Fleet Grain Program